Micropterix turkmeniella is a species of moth belonging to the family Micropterigidae which was described by Vladimir Ivanovitsch Kuznetzov in 1960, and is endemic to Turkmenistan.

References

Micropterigidae
Endemic fauna of Turkmenistan
Insects of Central Asia
Moths described in 1960
Moths of Asia
Taxa named by Vladimir Ivanovitsch Kuznetzov